Farzaneh Fasihi (also  as "Farzāneh Fasihi", ; born 1993 in Isfahan) is an Iranian sprinter. She represented her country at more than 10 competitions both outdoor and indoor Asian Athletics Championships. Fasihi is the Iranian record holder of the 60 metres indoor with 7.25 seconds.

Sporting career 
Farzaneh Fasihi's first international experience was at the 2016 Asian Indoor Athletics Championships in Doha, where she finished her competition as 5th in 60 m and in 4 x 400 m relay achieving silver medal. In 2017, she participated in the Islamic Solidarity Games in Baku and reached over semi-finals in 100 m. In 2018, she participated in Asian Indoor Athletics Championships in Tehran, where she won the bronze medal in the 60 m with a 7.44 seconds record.

In 2018, Fasihi became Iranian champion in 100 m and indoor champion in the 60 m.

In 2020, Fasihi qualified as the first Iranian woman to compete at the World Athletics Indoor Championships.

Personal bests
Outdoor
100 metres – 11.44 (NR) (summer 2022)
200 metres – 23.96 (summer 2018)
Indoor
60 metres – 7.25 (NR) (Istanbul, Istanbul Cup, February, 2020)

International competitions
  medal: Western Asia Championships, 2012, Dubai, UAE, in 4x400 m
  medal: 2021 Islamic Solidarity Games, held in 2022, Konya, Turkey, in 100m: 11.12 (NR)
  medal: Asian Indoor Athletics Championships, 2016, Doha, Qatar, in 4x400 m: 4:06.51
  medal: Western Asia Championships, 2012, Dubai, UAE, in 100 m
  medal: Malaysian International Athletics Competition, 2012, Kuala Lumpur, Malaysia, in 4x400 m
  medal: 21st Fajr International Indoor Athletics Championships, 2013, Tehran, Iran in 60 m: 7.60
  medal: Asian Indoor Athletics Championships, 2018, Tehran, Iran, in 60 m: 7.44
  medal: Malaysian International Athletics Competition, 2012, Kuala Lumpur, Malaysia, in 100 m
  medal: Malaysian International Athletics Competition, 2012, Kuala Lumpur, Malaysia, in 200 m
  medal: Asian Indoor Championships, 2018, Tehran, Iran, in 60 m: 7.44
 5th place: Asian Indoor Championships, 2016, Doha, Qatar, in 60 m

References

External links
 
 Farzaneh Fasihi's personal page on Instagram
 Farzaneh Fasihi's page on LinkedIn

Living people
1993 births
Iranian female sprinters
Athletes (track and field) at the 2020 Summer Olympics
Olympic athletes of Iran
Olympic female sprinters
Islamic Solidarity Games competitors for Iran
Islamic Solidarity Games medalists in athletics